Gannaway is a surname. Notable people with the surname include:

Bobs Gannaway (born 1965), American writer, producer, director, and actor
Gary Gannaway (born 1954), American businessman, entrepreneur, and philanthropist
Preston Gannaway, American photojournalist
William Trigg Gannaway (1825–1902), American academic